Luilu is a territory in Lomami province of the Democratic Republic of the Congo.

Territories of Lomami Province